Josh Larsen may refer to:

 Josh Larsen (speedway rider) (born 1972), American motorcycle speedway rider
 Josh Larsen (rugby union) (born 1994), Canadian rugby union player